The Type 5 75 mm tank gun was used as the main armament of the Imperial Japanese Army prototype Type 4 Chi-To medium tank. It was one of the largest tank guns to be fitted on a World War II Japanese tank. Due to late war shortage-induced delays only two were ever mounted in a completed Type 4 Chi-To, neither of which saw combat use. The tank gun was also used on the prototype Type 5 Chi-Ri medium tank and prototype Type 5 Na-To tank destroyer.

Design and use 

The Type 5 75 mm tank gun was intended as the main armament of the Type 4 Chi-To medium tank, a planned improvement over the Imperial Army's most powerful production tank, the Type 3 Chi-Nu. The first prototype Type 4 Chi-To was delivered in 1944. Though the most advanced and powerful Japanese tank to leave the drawing board, late war industrial and material shortages resulted in only two being completed.

The long-barreled 75 mm L/56.4 (4.23 m) tank gun was a variant of the Japanese Type 4 75mm AA Gun, which went into production in 1943. Mounted in the large, hexagonal turret of the Type 4 Chi-To, it was capable of being elevated between -6.5 to +20 degrees.  Its  muzzle velocity gave it an armor penetration of 75 millimeters at 1,000 meters.

Intended Type 4 Chi-To production was 25 tanks per month spread over two Mitsubishi Heavy Industries factories. Late war shortage-induced delays resulted in only 6 chassis being built by 1945 and just two tanks were known to be completed. Neither of the completed tanks were used in combat prior to the end of the war in the Pacific.

The Type 5 tank gun was mounted into a prototype Type 5 Chi-Ri medium tank as its main gun. The Type 5 Chi-Ri used a lengthened version of the Type 4 Chi-To chassis and had thicker sloped welded armor. With the end of the Pacific War, an incomplete Type 5 prototype was seized by American forces during the occupation of Japan.

The prototype Type 5 Na-To tank destroyer also used the Type 5 tank gun as its main armament. Only two Type 5 Na-To units were completed by the surrender of Japan. Neither were used in combat.

Notes

References

Taki's Imperial Japanese Army Page - Akira Takizawa

World War II artillery of Japan
World War II tank guns
Tank guns of Japan
Weapons and ammunition introduced in 1944